Hubert Geronimo Fermina  (9 May 1948 – 25 May 2022) was a Dutch nurse and politician. As a member of Democrats 66 he was a member of the municipal council of Lelystad from 1974 to 1981, a member of the States-Provincial of South Holland from 1986 to 1990, a member of the municipal council and also an alderman of Dordrecht from 1990 to 1994, and a member of the House of Representatives from 1994 to 1998.

References 

  Parlement.com biography

1948 births
2022 deaths
20th-century Dutch politicians
Aldermen of Dordrecht
Democrats 66 politicians
Dutch nurses
Male nurses
Members of the House of Representatives (Netherlands)
Members of the Provincial Council of South Holland
Municipal councillors in Flevoland
Municipal councillors of Dordrecht
People from Lelystad
People from Willemstad